"Sister Morphine" is a song written by Marianne Faithfull, Mick Jagger and Keith Richards. Faithfull released the original version of the song as the B-side to her Decca Records single "Something Better" on 21 February 1969.  A different version was released two years later by the Rolling Stones for their 1971 album Sticky Fingers. Jagger produced the track.

Recording and composition
The personnel for the Faithfull version are Marianne on vocals, Jagger on acoustic guitar, Ry Cooder on slide guitar and bass guitar, Jack Nitzsche on piano and organ, and Charlie Watts on drums. It was recorded during the Let It Bleed sessions.

The original UK Decca single credited Faithfull as a co-writer, but when London Records issued the single in the United States, her name was omitted, as it was from the credit on Sticky Fingers. After a legal battle Faithfull retained her rights as a co-author, acknowledged by the 1994 Virgin Records reissue of the Stones' album catalogue from Sticky Fingers through Steel Wheels.

Releases
In the United Kingdom, Faithfull's single was withdrawn by Decca due to the drug reference in the title, after an estimated 500 copies had been issued, but in other countries the single remained in release. In some territories such as the Netherlands, Italy and Japan, “Sister Morphine” appeared on the A-side. In addition, the French, US and Netherlands editions of the single actually featured alternate versions of both sides to the UK release. Faithfull performed "Something Better" sung live to a backing track at The Rolling Stones Rock and Roll Circus, but the programme was never televised and no contemporary performance of "Sister Morphine" is known.

Faithfull recorded the song again in 1979, during the sessions for her Broken English album, and it was subsequently released on a 7-inch and 12-inch single with "Broken English". This recording appears as a bonus track on the second disc of the 2013 deluxe edition of the album. The song remains a staple of her concert set-list and appeared on the live albums Blazing Away in 1990 and No Exit in 2016.

Rolling Stones version
The Stones' version, with slightly different lyrics, featured Jagger on vocals, Richards on acoustic guitar and backing vocals, Cooder and Nitzsche again on slide guitar and piano respectively, Bill Wyman on bass, and Watts again on drums.

Rarely played by the Rolling Stones in concert, it was performed live during the band's 1997-1998 Bridges to Babylon Tour, and featured on the subsequent live album, No Security.

References

1969 songs
1969 singles
Marianne Faithfull songs
The Rolling Stones songs
London Records singles
Songs written by Jagger–Richards
Songs about drugs
Song recordings produced by Jimmy Miller
Song recordings produced by Mick Jagger